George Poteet is an American Memphis-based land speed racer and winner of the 1996 Ridler Award.

Poteet's 1937 Ford roadster (built by Don Pilkenton) won the 1996 Ridler Award.  This car would go on to take "America's Most Beautiful Roadster", top prize at the Oakland Roadster Show. 

breaking both the C/BFS and D/BFS (supercharged fuel streamliner) records. After making "the fastest piston engine pass ever", Speed Demon was displayed at the 2018 Detroit Autorama.

Notes

External links 
Hot Rod online

American racing drivers
Land speed records
Living people
Year of birth missing (living people)
Bonneville 300 MPH Club members